María Alexandra Catherine Siachoque Gaete (born 21 January 1973) is a Colombian actress best known for her (mostly villainess) roles in numerous telenovelas.

Early life
Siachoque was born in Bogota, Colombia.

Career
Siachoque has appeared in Telemundo produced series such as Pecados ajenos, Tierra de Pasiones, Te voy a enseñar a querer, La Venganza, Amantes del Desierto, and the TV anthology series Decisiones. Though she has become type cast as villainess, some would consider her a sympathetic character as Doña Hilda de Santana in Telemundo telenovela Sin Senos no hay Paraíso.  In 2010, she reverted to villainess as Cecilia Altamira in the Telemundo remake of ¿Dónde Está Elisa?. In 2011, she later played a complex character in another telenovela remake produced by Telemundo, La Casa de al Lado wherein she was the mistress (amante) of a character portrayed by her real-life husband Miguel Varoni, wherein she interacted with Maritza Rodríguez, Gabriel Porras, and Karla Monroig. In 2014, she marked her villainess return in Reina de Corazónes, starring Paola Núñez, Eugenio Siller and Juan Soler. Since 2016, she has been playing the character of Hilda Santana in Sin senos sí hay paraíso.

Personal life
She has been married to Argentine-Colombian producer, actor and director Miguel Varoni since 1999 but they have been together since 1996. They acted together in a series called “Te voy a ensenar a querer”, “La Casa de Al Lado”. They met each other during Las Juanas, in which telenovela they both had parts.

Filmography

References

External links
 

Colombian television actresses
Colombian telenovela actresses
1972 births
Living people